, who is also known as Ichiyōsai Yoshitaki (一養斎 芳滝), was a Japanese designer of ukiyo-e woodblock prints who was active in both Edo (Tokyo) and Osaka.  He was also a painter and newspaper illustrator.  His father was a paste merchant, and Yoshitaki became a student of Utagawa Yoshiume (1819–1879).  Yoshitaki was the most prolific designer of woodblock prints in Osaka from the 1860s to the 1880s, producing more than 1,200 different prints, almost all of kabuki actors.

Gallery

References

 Lane, Richard, Images from the Floating World, The Japanese Print, New York, Putnam, 1978, 349.
 Newland, Amy Reigle. (2005). Hotei Encyclopedia of Japanese Woodblock Prints.  Amsterdam: Hotei. ;  OCLC 61666175 
 Roberts, Laurance P. (1976). A Dictionary of Japanese Artists. New York: Weatherhill. ;  OCLC 2005932 

1841 births
1899 deaths
19th-century Japanese people
19th-century Japanese painters
Yoshitaki